Charles Irving Glicksberg (13 December 1900 – 14 February 1998 was a Polish-American literary critic, professor, and writer.

Life 

Glicksberg was born to Lillian and Isidore Glicksberg in Warsaw, Poland. He moved to the United States at a young age and became a naturalized citizen. He attended the College of the City of New York for a bachelor's degree which he received in 1923, Columbia University for a masters which he received in 1924, and the University of Pennsylvania for a PhD which he received in 1938. He was also a Fulbright Scholar at Bar-Ilan University in Israel. His PhD dissertation became the book Walt Whitman and the Civil War which was considered an important addition to the existent scholarship on Whitman. He died on February 14, 1988, survived by his two children, Stephanie and Paul, grandchildren Elena, Benjamin, and Rachel, and great-grandchildren, Talia, Danielle, and Jacob, in New York City.

Teaching 

Glicksberg taught English at South Philadelphia High School for multiple years, and eventually joined Brooklyn College as a professor, becoming professor emeritus by 1971. He also taught at multiple other colleges, including the New School for Social Research and the City University of New York.

Writing
He was a prolific author, writing multiple books including Walt Whitman and the Civil War (University of Pennsylvania Press, 1933), (which in particular was referred to as an important addition to the existing writing on Walt Whitman) Literature and Religion, A Study in Conflict (Southern Methodist University Press, 1960), The Self in Modern Literature (Pennsylvania State University Press, 1963), Modern Literature and the Death of God (Martinus Nijhoff, 1966), The Literature of Nihilism (Bucknell University Press, 1975), and others. He was also the editor of American Literary Criticism, 1900 to 1950 (Hendricks House, 1952) and wrote multiple essays including for the Arizona Quarterly.

Awards 

Glicksberg received several awards for "best essay" from the Arizona Quarterly and received various honors in his multiple professorships. He also was awarded a Fulbright Scholarship.

Literary criticism 

Glicksberg wrote on a variety of topics, but especially some of his later books like The Ironic Vision in Modern Literature focused on the progression from more heroic tales to more ironic tales as writing approaches the modern day.

References 

American literary critics
1900 births
1998 deaths
Brooklyn College faculty
Bar-Ilan University alumni
City College of New York alumni
Columbia University alumni
University of Pennsylvania alumni
Polish emigrants to the United States